The Monastery of St. Nicodemus is a monastery and church of the Greek Orthodox Patriarchate of Jerusalem, dedicated to Nicodemus. It is in Jerusalem's Muslim Quarter, south of Herod's Gate and 90 metres north of the Via Dolorosa.

According to an Orthodox belief, Saint Peter's prison was in its basement, where he was jailed by Herod Agrippa and then freed by an angel.

Names 

Its common name in Arabic,  ("Monastery of Lentils"), dates to the 16th century or earlier.
An Orthodox tradition says it is because lentils were cooked there, using the Cauldron of Saint Helen, to feed to the builders of the Church of the Resurrection (Church of the Holy Sepulchre) or that St. Helen fed crowds lentils there during a famine.

A pseudo-etymological interpretation is that  is a phonetic distortion of Herod Antipas, and a 19th-century assumption was that Herod Antipas's house was there. However, the church's belief is that it was Simon the Pharisee's house and that Christ spoke with Nicodemus there.
 
It was known as St. Elias Monastery before renamed Nicodemus. 
In Greek, it is called  ("Holy Monastery of St. Nicodemus").

History 

The Syriac Orthodox Church (Syriac Jacobites) bought the building from its Muslim owner in 1527 or 1532. 
(The Syriacs still worship at the Chapel of St. Nicodemus in the Church of the Holy Sepulchre.)
Around 1865, the Greeks bought the property, and in 1908, they restored the building and dedicated it to St. Nicodemus.

, its supervisor is Archimandrite Makarios.

References 

Greek Orthodox Church of Jerusalem
Eastern Orthodox church buildings in Jerusalem
Muslim Quarter (Jerusalem)